Odites obumbrata is a moth in the family Depressariidae. It was described by Edward Meyrick in 1925. It is found in Zimbabwe.

The wingspan is about 18 mm. The forewings are fuscous with a moderate attenuated whitish-ochreous costal streak from the base to beyond the middle, the costal edge slenderly fuscous towards the base. The hindwings are blackish grey.

References

Moths described in 1925
Odites
Taxa named by Edward Meyrick